Boxing at the 1992 Summer Olympics took place in the old Pavelló Club Joventut Badalona in Barcelona. The boxing schedule began on 26 July and ended on 9 August. Twelve boxing events (all men's individual) were contested, with the participation of 336 athletes from 78 countries.

Medal table

Medalists

References

External links
 Results

 
1992
Olympics
1992 Summer Olympics events